Michael Martin Cruz (born 31 January 1998) is a Caymanian footballer. Besides Cayman Islands, he has played in Jamaica. On 23 March 2020, Martin received a 10-year ban from the Cayman Islands Football Association for assaulting a referee following a 23 January match of the 2019–20 Premier League against Academy SC.

Career statistics

Club

Notes

International

International goals
Scores and results list the Cayman Islands' goal tally first.

References

External links
 Michael Martin at CaribbeanFootballDatabase
 

1998 births
Living people
Association football midfielders
Caymanian footballers
People from Cayman Brac
Caymanian expatriate footballers
Expatriate footballers in Jamaica
Caymanian expatriate sportspeople in Jamaica
Harbour View F.C. players
Bodden Town F.C. players
National Premier League players
Cayman Islands Premier League players
Cayman Islands international footballers